"Plain Jane" is a song by American rapper ASAP Ferg. The song was released on June 13, 2017, as the lead single from his third studio album, Still Striving (2017). It was produced by Kirk Knight, and it is a hip hop song. "Plain Jane" has peaked at number 26 on the Billboard Hot 100, becoming his highest-charting single. The official remix for "Plain Jane" was released on December 15, 2017, with Nicki Minaj.

Background and composition
"Plain Jane" is one of four tracks released by A$AP Ferg on June 13, 2017, via SoundCloud for TrapLord Tuesdays. Produced by Pro Era's own Kirk Knight, the track's flow and instrumental are heavily influenced by the 1999 song "Slob on My Knob" by Tear Da Club Up Thugs. Ferg reflects his childhood growing up and pays homage to ASAP Yams ("Yamborghini chain, rest in peace to my superior"). He also raps about "eating Rihanna like a panini" ("Please believe me, I see RiRi, I'mma eat it like panini") and suggests having a foursome with his girlfriend, Kendall Jenner, Bella and Gigi Hadid.

Music video
The official music video of the song was released on October 11, 2017. Directed by Bronx director Hidji, it opens with ASAP Ferg standing in an apartment hallway tying his do-rag, with a clip of Juicy J's verse on an unreleased remix of the song playing in the background. It then follows Ferg surrounded by a crew of BMX bike riders, as they ride through Harlem before going to a night club. The video features cameos from cyclists Nigel Sylvester and RRDBlocks, who join Ferg and do tricks, as well as from DRAM and Rihanna.

Track listing

Remix
A remix to the single was released on December 15, 2017, with a guest appearance from fellow Trinidadian-American rapper Nicki Minaj. The remix was originally meant to be included on Lil Wayne's Dedication 6 mixtape, but after playing it for Ferg, Minaj agreed to make it the official remix instead. Minaj's verse includes references to Tidal, The Notorious B.I.G., Catherine Zeta Jones, and Lupita Nyong'o. Phemza The Kween also freestyled the song. There is an unreleased remix version of the song featuring Juicy J, who shared his verse in May 2018.

Minaj's remix received critical acclaim. Billboard said "Nicki Minaj brought back that hard rap we've been missing from her for years, paying homage to her New York roots and local legend Notorious B.I.G." XXL writes "the female MC delivers some hardcore rhymes and punchlines on the catchy tracks," and Complex noted that, due to Minaj, "one of the best loved songs of the year is about to get even more love".

Chart performance
Following months of hovering around the top 40, "Plain Jane" was propelled by its remix to its peak at number 26 on the Billboard Hot 100, Ferg's second highest entry on the chart. The song has also charted in Canada, at number 30.

Charts

Weekly charts

Year-end charts

Certifications

References

2017 singles
2017 songs
ASAP Ferg songs
Nicki Minaj songs
Songs written by Nicki Minaj
RCA Records singles
Songs written by ASAP Ferg
Songs written by DJ Paul
Songs written by Juicy J